Jana Vladimirovna Beller (born 27 October 1990 in Omsk) is a Soviet-born German model, best known for winning the sixth cycle of Germany's Next Top Model.

Early life
Beller was born in the Soviet Union to ethnic German parents and moved to Germany when she was a child. She has been playing chess since she was five years old. In 2009 Beller was featured in a documentary that showed ambitious girls attempting to start a modelling career.

Germany's Next Top Model
Beller won the sixth cycle of Germany's Next Top Model.  She was declared the winner in a live finale on 9 July 2011.  Her prizes included 100,000 € in money and a 300,000 € contract with the Agency "One Eins", under the management of host Heidi Klum's father.
However, soon after she switched to another agency.

Career
She has since signed with new agencies and was on the cover of Cosmopolitan. Furthermore, she works for Misslyn and  Rockberries. Since August 2012 Jana Beller works for Hugo Boss and Esprit.

Agencies
 Louisa Models (Germany) 
 View Management (Spain) 
 Elite Model Management (London) 
 Ace-Models (Greece) 
 IMG Models (Italy)
 Elite Model Management (Denmark) 
 NOVA-Models (New Zealand)

References

1990 births
Living people
German female models
Female models from Omsk
Russian emigrants to Germany
Germany's Next Topmodel winners